Líšnice may refer to:

 Líšnice (Ústí nad Orlicí District), a village in the Czech Republic
 Líšnice (Šumperk District), a village in the Czech Republic
 Líšnice (Prague-West District), a village in the Czech Republic

See also
 Lišnice, a village in Most District, Ústí nad Labem Region, Czech Republic